Aphanopus, the black scabbardfishes, is a genus of Cutlassfish which contains the following species:

 Aphanopus arigato Parin, 1994
 Aphanopus beckeri Parin, 1994
 Aphanopus capricornis Parin, 1994
 Aphanopus carbo Lowe, 1839 (Black scabbardfish)
 Aphanopus intermedius Parin, 1983 (Intermediate scabbardfish)
 Aphanopus microphthalmus Norman, 1939 (Smalleye scabbardfish)
 Aphanopus mikhailini Parin, 1983 (Mikhailin's scabbardfish)

References

General references

 
 

Trichiuridae
Madeiran cuisine
Taxa named by Richard Thomas Lowe
Marine fish genera